Goran Obradović may refer to:

 Goran Obradović (footballer, born 1976), Serbian footballer
 Goran Obradović (footballer, born 1986), (1986-2021) Serbian footballer.
 Goran Obradović (coach) (born 1971), Serbian track and field coach